Red Hands Black Deeds is the sixth studio album by the American hard rock band Shaman's Harvest. It was released on July 28, 2017, through Mascot Label Group.

Track listing

Charts

References

2017 albums
Shaman's Harvest albums